John Fairbairn may refer to:
 Jock Fairbairn ( 1890s), Scottish football goalkeeper with Heart of Midlothian
 John Fairbairn (writer), English political journalist, author and translator
 John Fairbairn (Horticulturist), Curator of Chelsea Physic Garden 1784–1814
 John Fairbairn (educator) (1794–1854), newspaper proprietor, educator, financier and politician
 John Fairbairn, prisoner on St. Michael of Scarborough
 John Fairbairn (skeleton racer) (born 1983), Canadian skeleton racer
 John Fairbairn (naval officer) (1912–1984), South African naval officer who annexed the Prince Edward islands for South Africa
 Kaʻimi Fairbairn, full name John Christian Kaʻiminoeauloamekaʻikeokekumupaʻa Fairbairn (born 1994), American football player